Ellis Roberts may refer to:

 Ellis H. Roberts (1827–1918), United States Representative from New York
 Ellis William Roberts (1860–1930), English portrait painter